The Olivar-Asselin Award (in French: Prix Olivar-Asselin) is an award created in 1955. It is given by the Saint-Jean-Baptiste Society of Montreal (SSJBM) to a Quebec journalist having distinguished themselves in the field of journalism. It is named after journalist Olivar Asselin, a former SSJBM president.

Winners 
 Jean-Marie Morin (1955)
 Alfred Ayotte (1956)
 René Lévesque (1957)
 Pierre Vigeant (1958)
 René Lecavalier (1959)
 Omer Héroux (1960)
 Harry Bernard (1961)
 Germaine Bernier (1962)
 Emery Leblanc (1963)
 Vincent Prince (1964)
 Jean-Marc Léger (1965)
 Marcel Adam (1966)
 Lucien Langlois (1967)
 Roland Prévost (1968)
 Claude Lapointe (1969)
 Paul Sauriol (1971)
 Judith Jasmin (1972)
 Roland Berthiaume (1973)
 Lysiane Gagnon (1975)
 Evelyn Dumas (1976)
 Fernand Seguin (1977)
 Jean-V. Dufresne (1978)
 Pierre Nadeau (1979)
 Jean Paré (1980)
 Bernard Derome (1981)
 Marcel Pépin (1982)
 Guy Cormier (1983)
 Claude Beauchamp (1984)
 Gérald Leblanc (1985)
 Louis-Gilles Francoeur (1986)
 Andréanne Lafond (1987)
 Michel Roy (1990)
 Renée Rowan (1991)
 Gilles Lesage (1993)
 Laurent Laplante (1996)
 Normand Lester (2001)
 Christian Rioux (2010)
 Pierre Allard (2014)

Notes

External links 
 "Le prix Olivar-Asselin", in the site of the SSJB of Montreal

Canadian journalism awards
Saint-Jean-Baptiste Society
Quebec awards
1955 establishments in Quebec